The Central Virginia Governor's School for Science and Technology (CVGS) is a regional school in Lynchburg, Virginia directed by Dr. Stephen Smith. Students are chosen from Lynchburg-area county and city schools. Schools participating in the Governor's School include those from Amherst County (Amherst County High School), Appomattox County (Appomattox County High School), Bedford County (Jefferson Forest High School, Liberty High School), Campbell County (Altavista High School, Brookville High School, Rustburg High School, William Campbell High School), and the City of Lynchburg (E. C. Glass High School, Heritage High School).

Students attend the Governor's School during their junior and senior years. They take mathematics and science courses at the Governor's School in the morning and return to their home high schools in the afternoon for the remainder of their classes. Apart from its math and science courses, the Governor's School offers Junior Research and Senior Seminar, classes particular to this Governor's School. These classes are designed to expose students to areas they may not have had in their regular schools. Junior Research introduces CVGS juniors to research and the scientific process, skills that are invaluable later on in college environments. Senior Seminar gives CVGS seniors a taste of different uses of technology in science.

The program is housed in its own facility and is governed by a regional board composed of a school board member from each participating division. Financial support is provided by the participating school divisions, the Gifted Programs Office of the Virginia Department of Education and Region 2000 business and industry partners.

Classes

Junior year
 Junior Research
 Math Analysis/Precalculus or College Calculus I and II
 Physics (calculus-based)

Senior year
Senior Seminar
College Physics or College Anatomy and Physiology
College Calculus I and II or Connections in Mathematics or Linear Algebra/Vector Calculus

Junior Research 
Junior Research is an introduction to the research process; it gives students experience in designing individual projects, running elementary statistical analysis, project research, and scientific writing. Students use these skills to design their own project; they report their results in paper, scientific poster, and online formats.

During the fall semester, students select their research categories and conduct a thorough literature review as they narrow their ideas down to a specific topic, research question, and hypothesis. Once they have a clear research question, they design their studies and submit them for approval. Once approved, students implement their designs and collect their data. During the second semester, students analyze their data, report their results and conclusions, and finish writing their papers. From the paper they move to the scientific poster and PowerPoint presentation. Most juniors participate in the regional science fair, and many go on to the state fair. Most students also participate in the Virginia Junior Academy of Science statewide research symposium. This is the venue in which they share all they have learned through a 10-minute PowerPoint presentation.

In the spring, for 12 Fridays, juniors experience an internship with a local business or company.

Senior Seminar
Senior Seminar provides seniors with the opportunity to continue developing their individual research skills, to learn more about current topics in science and mathematics, and to use sophisticated technology which is part of the modern research setting. Students pursue topics on an individual basis and in small groups. The first six weeks students spend on the Engineering Bridge Project. For the next four six week periods students participate in a Technology Laboratory or working on a Senior Research Project. During the final six weeks, all seniors work in groups on the capstone Senior Science Scenario project, which ends with formal group presentations the last week of school.

Public high schools in Virginia
Magnet schools in Virginia
Schools in Lynchburg, Virginia
Educational institutions established in 1985
1985 establishments in Virginia